Frank Farrington (8 July 1873 – 27 May 1924) was an American silent film actor.

Farrington was born in Brixton, London, England.

Farrington died in Los Angeles, California, after a choking spell from a throat infection at the height of his acting career on 27 May 1924.

Filmography
 The Man Who Fights Alone (1924) .... Struthers
 The Courtship of Miles Standish (1923) .... Isaac Allerton
 The Clean Up (1923) .... Amos Finderson
 In the Days of Daniel Boone (1923) .... Judge Henderson The Face at Your Window (1920) .... District Attorney
 The Scar (1919) .... Thaddeus Tabor
 To Hell with the Kaiser! (1918) .... General Pershing
 The Long Trail (1917) .... Undetermined role
 Pamela's Past (1916)
 The Cossack Whip (1916) .... Fedor Turov
 Through Turbulent Waters (1915) .... Paul Temple
 On the Brink of the Abyss (1915)
 A Man of Iron (1915)
 A Hatful of Trouble (1914) .... Wendall Wiggins
 Zudora (1914) .... Captain Radcliffe
 The Million Dollar Mystery (1914) .... Braine
 Was She Right in Forgiving Him? (1914)
 A Mohammedan Conspiracy (1914)
 The Strategy of Conductor 786 (1914) Beating Back (1914)
 A Debut in the Secret Service (1914)
 Repentance (1914)
 Pamela Congreve (1914)
 A Slight Mistake'' (1911)

References

External links
 

1873 births
1924 deaths
American male film actors
American male silent film actors
20th-century American male actors
British emigrants to the United States